Iotyrris kingae is a species of sea snail, a marine gastropod mollusk in the family Turridae, the turrids.

Description
The length of the shell varies between 20 mm and 35 mm.

Distribution
I. devoizei has been found off the Hawaiian Islands, Christmas Island and the Philippines.

References

 Powell, A. W. B. 1964. The family Turridae in the Indo-Pacific. Indo-Pacific Mollusca 1. (5): 227–346; 1 (7): 409–454.

External links
 Abdelkrim, J.; Aznar-Cormano, L.; Buge, B.; Fedosov, A.; Kantor, Y.; Zaharias, P.; Puillandre, N. (2018). Delimiting species of marine gastropods (Turridae, Conoidea) using RAD sequencing in an integrative taxonomy framework. Molecular Ecology. 27(22): 4591-4611
 Gastropods.com: Lophiotoma (Xenuroturris) kingae

kingae
Gastropods described in 1964